Sonny Karlsson (born 14 June 1988) is a Swedish footballer who plays as a forward for Oskarshamns AIK.

References

External links

Sonny Karlsson at Fotbolltransfers 
 

1988 births
Living people
Swedish footballers
IK Oddevold players
IS Halmia players
Utsiktens BK players
Landskrona BoIS players
Ljungskile SK players
FC Etar 1924 Veliko Tarnovo players
Syrianska FC players
AEL Kalloni F.C. players
Oskarshamns AIK players
Superettan players
First Professional Football League (Bulgaria) players
Expatriate footballers in Bulgaria
Expatriate footballers in Greece
Association football forwards